Fratricelli, a diminutive of the Latin Fratri "brothers", can refer to:

 the Fraticelli, a series of heretical groups 
 the Franciscan mendicant order

fr:Fraticelli